Arli is a given name. Notable people with the name include:

Arli Chontey (born 1992), Kazakh weightlifter 
Arli Liberman (born 1986), Israeli guitarist and record producer

See also
Arli National Park in Burkina Faso 
Arliss (surname)
Carli (given name)